Nøklevann is a lake in Østmarka in Oslo, Norway. It has a surface area of 0.8 km², and is 163 meters above sea level. The lake drains through Ljanselva to Bunnefjorden. It is a former drinking water supply for Oslo.

References

Lakes of Oslo
Reservoirs in Norway